Francisco de Jaén, O.S.Io.Hieros. or Francisco de Ilhaen was a Roman Catholic prelate who served as Auxiliary Bishop of Seville (1530–?).

Biography
Francisco de Jaén was ordained a priest in the Order of the Knights of Saint John of Jerusalem. On 5 Dec 1530, he was appointed during the papacy of Pope Clement VII as Auxiliary Bishop of Seville and Titular Bishop of Christopolis. On 12 May 1532, he was consecrated bishop by Gabriele Mascioli Foschi, Archbishop of Durrës.

References

External links and additional sources
 (for Chronology of Bishops) 
 (for Chronology of Bishops) 

16th-century Roman Catholic bishops in Spain
Bishops appointed by Pope Clement VII
Knights Hospitaller bishops